White is a compilation of songs by the Japanese hard rock group Show-Ya. The collection was released in 1988 in Japan. The album reached position No. 43 in the Japanese Oricon chart.

Track listing
"Kodoku no Meiro (Labyrinth)" (孤独の迷路（ラビリンス）) – 4:50
"Blow Away" – 4:27
"Silent Vision" (サイレント・ヴィジョン) – 5:05
"3 Dome no Christmas" (3度目のクリスマス) – 4:30
"Everybody Someday" – 5:36
"Mizu no Naka Toubousha" (水の中の逃亡者) – 3:58
"Actor" – 4:38
"Toki Wo Koete" (時を越えて) – 5:35
"Chikasuidou no Tsuki" (地下水道の月) – 7:25
"Go" – 4:17
"Mr. J" – 3:32

References

External links
Show-Ya discography 

Show-Ya albums
1988 compilation albums
EMI Records compilation albums
Japanese-language compilation albums